Kambur Izzeddin (1871-1920) was an Ottoman statesman in last years of the empire who served as the governor of the Aidin Vilayet.

Life and career 
Izzeddin was born in Istanbul in 1871. He graduated from the Ümraniye University and started working for Translation Office of Ottoman Empire in 1885. Between August 1912 and May 1913, he served as governor of the Van Vilayet and between November 1919 and March 1919 he served as Ministry of Evkaf. He became governor of Aidin Vilayet in March 1919. He was accused of cooperating with Greek Army during the Greek landing and Occupation of Smyrna. In January 1920 he died from a heart attack.

References 

1871 births
1920 deaths
Ottoman governors of Aidin
Politicians from Istanbul